Cornette is a French-origin surname. Notable people with the surname include:

 Antoine-Louis Cornette (1860-1936), French clergyman
 Claude-Melchior Cornette (1744 – 1794), French chemist and physician
 Deimantė Cornette (born 1989), Lithuanian chess-player
 Frédéric Cornette (born 1967), French athlete
 James Mark Cornette (born 1961), American wrestler and wrestling commentator who also ran Camp Cornette
 Junior Cornette (born 1966), Guyanese sprinter
 Marcelle Lentz-Cornette (1927 – 2008), Luxembourg politician
 Matthieu Cornette (born 1985), French chess-player
 Quentin Cornette (born 1994), French soccer player

See also 
 La Cornette, village in Belgium
 La Cornette (farce), a play
 Cornet (rank), former cavalry rank
 9M133 Kornet, a Russian missile
 Cornett (surname)
 Cornet (disambiguation)